The Create Project is a web-based community focused on communication and sharing between Free and Open Source Creative applications.
Initially the project was created by freedesktop.org as a space for collaboration between free software creative projects, since then the project has become a full sub-project. Create now aims to develop and consolidate shared resources for creative applications.  Several community-developed specifications have begun to be developed under the project such as OpenRaster and the Swatches colour file format.

Some of the many groups that come together under this project include Blender, GIMP, Inkscape, Scribus, Audacity, Open Clip Art Library, Open Font Library and the Aiki Framework which produce creative content, one of the major ways these groups come together is through the Libre Graphics Meeting which is hosted by the Create Project.

Specifications

See also 

 Libre Graphics Meeting
 FreeDesktop.org
 Inkscape
 GIMP
 Scribus
 sK1
 Blender
 Audacity
 Open Clip Art Library
 Open Font Library
 Aiki Framework
 free and open-source software
 Open Source Developers' Conference

References

External links 
 
 Create Project mailing list archives
 

Freedesktop.org
Cross-platform free software
Free graphics software